The Hintertaunus ("Farther Taunus") is a natural region in the German Central Upland range of the Taunus (major unit group 30), which rises to a height of  and lies north of the High Taunus (301). It extends as far as the river Rhine to the west, the river Lahn to the north and the Wetterau hills to the east. It is divided into the Eastern Hintertaunus (major unit 302), Idstein Basin (303) and Western Hintertaunus (304).

External links 

Taunus